The Lincoln, sometimes called the Lincoln Longwool, is a breed of sheep from England. The Lincoln is the largest British sheep, developed specifically to produce the heaviest, longest and most lustrous fleece of any breed in the world. Great numbers were exported to many countries to improve the size and wool quality of their native breeds. The versatile fleece is in great demand for spinning, weaving and many other crafts.

It is now one of Britain's rarer breeds,  categorized as "at risk" by the Rare Breeds Survival Trust since there are fewer than 1500 registered breeding females in the United Kingdom.

Characteristics
Fleece of the Lincoln is carried in heavy locks that are often twisted into a spiral near the end. The fleece has a numeric count of 36's - 46's and ranges from 41.0 to 33.5 microns in diameter. Although coarse and somewhat hair-like, the fleece does have considerable luster.

References

External links

 U.K. Lincoln breeders association

History of Lincolnshire
Sheep breeds
Sheep breeds originating in England